Robert Pontarollo (born 12 November 1971) a former Italian male canoeist who won thirteen medal at senior level at the Wildwater Canoeing World Championships.

Biography
Pontarollo won five edition of Wildwater Canoeing World Cup (1994, 1995, 1996, 1998, 2002). 

He was the technical director of the Italy national wildwater canoeing team, until 2017 when he was replaced by another Italian canoeing legend, Vladi Panato.

References

External links
 

1971 births
Living people
Italian male canoeists
Italian sports coaches
20th-century Italian people